Nicola Ferrari may refer to:
Nicola Ferrari (footballer born 1983), Italian footballer
Nicola Ferrari (footballer born 1989), Italian footballer